City to City is the second solo studio album by Scottish singer-songwriter Gerry Rafferty, released on 20 January 1978 by United Artists Records. It was Rafferty's first solo release in six years—and first release of any kind since 1975—due to his tenure in the band Stealers Wheel and subsequent legal proceedings which prevented Rafferty from releasing any new solo recordings for the next three years. The album was well received, peaking at No. 1 in the US and going Platinum, as well as reaching No. 6 in the UK Albums Chart and achieving Gold status. "Baker Street", "Right Down the Line" and "Home and Dry" were successfully released as singles.

Singles

"Baker Street"

United Artists wanted to use "City to City" as the lead single from the album, but Rafferty felt that "Baker Street" would be a better choice and eventually the latter song became the first single in most countries. Released on 3 February 1978, "Baker Street" peaked at No. 3 on the UK Singles Chart and spent four weeks at No. 1 in Canada. It reached No. 2 on the US Billboard Hot 100, spending six weeks there, and two weeks at No. 1 on the US Cash Box Top 100. The B-side of "Baker Street" was "Big Change in the Weather".

"Right Down the Line"
"Right Down the Line" reached number 12 on the Billboard Hot 100, peaked for two weeks at number eight on the Cash Box Top 100, and spent four non-consecutive weeks at number one on the Easy Listening chart in the US in 1978, the only Rafferty song to reach number one on this chart. Bonnie Raitt covered the song in 2012, including it in her Slipstream album.

"Home and Dry"
"Home and Dry" was the third single from the album in the United States, but did not have a UK release. It peaked at No. 28 on the Billboard Hot 100, marking a third consecutive Top 40 hit for Rafferty on that chart. It reached No. 23 in Canada. The B-side featured the sixth track from City to City, "Mattie's Rag".  It reached No. 26 on the U.S. Easy Listening chart, doing best on the Canadian Adult Contemporary chart, where it reached No. 7.

Speed discrepancy
In the U.S. and most countries outside the U.K., the original 1978 vinyl and cassette releases were pitched slightly higher than the actual recording speed, resulting in a total album length of around 51:12, a difference of roughly two minutes from the U.K length of 53 minutes. The three singles from the album were also released with this speed discrepancy, and the incorrect versions can still be heard on some radio stations to this day.

Track listing

Personnel 
 Gerry Rafferty – lead vocals, backing vocals (3-10) acoustic guitar (1, 4, 5), acoustic piano (10)
 Tommy Eyre – acoustic piano (1, 2, 3, 5–8), synthesizers (2, 5, 7, 8), organ (3, 9, 10), electric piano (2, 5, 9, 10), brass arrangements (10)
 Willy Ray – accordion (6, 9)
 Jerry Donahue – electric guitar (1)
 Hugh Burns – rhythm and lead guitars (2, 3, 4, 5, 8, 9, 10)
 Nigel Jenkins – rhythm guitar (2), lead guitar (8)
 Micky Moody – acoustic guitar (5)
 Andy Fairweather-Low – rhythm guitar (10)
 B.J. Cole – steel guitar (3, 4, 5, 9), dobro (6)
 Gary Taylor – bass and backing vocals (1-10)
 Henry Spinetti – drums (1-6, 8, 10)
 Graham Preskett – fiddle (1, 4, 6, 10), mandolin (1), string arrangements (2, 8), ARP string synthesizer (5, 6). brass arrangements (6)
 Glen LeFleur – tambourine (1, 3, 5), clave (3), congas (2, 10), drums (9)
 Hugh Murphy – tambourine (4)
 Raphael Ravenscroft – saxophones (2, 9)
 Paul Jones – harmonica (4)
 Barbara Dickson – backing vocals (1, 7)
 Roger Brown – backing vocals (4)
 Vivienne McAuliffe – backing vocals (4)
 John McBurnie – backing vocals (4)
 Rab Noakes – backing vocals (4)
 Joanna Carlin – backing vocals (7)

Australian bush band the Bushwackers featured on track 1 "The Ark", playing the introductory piece on fiddle, concertina and bodhran. This piece was also used under the guitar solo in the middle of the song.

Production 
 Gerry Rafferty – producer 
 Hugh Murphy – producer 
 Barry Hammond – recording 
 Declan O'Doherty – mixing 
 John Patrick Byrne – cover painting
 Additional recording at Berwick Street Studios and Marquee Studios (London, UK).
 Mixed at Advision Studios (London, UK).

Charts

Weekly charts

Year-end charts

Sales and certifications

References

Whitburn, Joel (1996). The Billboard Book of Top 40 Hits, 6th Edition (Billboard Publications)

External links

Gerry Rafferty albums
1978 albums
United Artists Records albums